Joel Charles Despaigne (born July 2, 1966  in Santiago de Cuba) a retired volleyball player from Cuba, who represented his native country in two consecutive Summer Olympics: the 1992 Summer Olympics in Barcelona (4th place) and the 1996 Summer Olympics in Atlanta (6th place).

Despaigne, also known by his nickname El Diablo,  has 350 caps in the Cuban national team. He was selected best volleyball player in the world of the 1989/1990 season. Despaigne lives in Italy and works as a volleyball coach.

References
 Spike by Joel Despaigne (YouTube)

1966 births
Living people
Sportspeople from Santiago de Cuba
Cuban men's volleyball players
Volleyball players at the 1992 Summer Olympics
Volleyball players at the 1996 Summer Olympics
Olympic volleyball players of Cuba
Iraklis V.C. players
Pan American Games gold medalists for Cuba
Pan American Games bronze medalists for Cuba
Pan American Games medalists in volleyball
Central American and Caribbean Games gold medalists for Cuba
Competitors at the 1990 Central American and Caribbean Games
Volleyball players at the 1991 Pan American Games
Volleyball players at the 1995 Pan American Games
Central American and Caribbean Games medalists in volleyball
Medalists at the 1991 Pan American Games
Medalists at the 1995 Pan American Games
20th-century Cuban people